The 6th Aintree 200 was a Formula One motor race held on 22 April 1961 at Aintree Circuit, Merseyside. The race was run over 50 laps of the circuit, and was won by Australian driver Jack Brabham in a Cooper T55-Climax, setting fastest lap in the process. Team mate Bruce McLaren was second and Graham Hill, starting from pole position, was third in a BRM-Climax.

Results

References
 "The Grand Prix Who's Who", Steve Small, 1995.
 "The Formula One Record Book", John Thompson, 1974.

Aintree 200
1961 in British motorsport
April 1961 sports events in the United Kingdom